St. George's Monastery may refer to:

 Monastery of Saint George of Choziba, Wadi Qelt, Palestine
 Monastery of Saint George, Skyros, Greece
 Saint George's Monastery, Homs, Syria
 St. George's Monastery, Al-Khader, Palestine
 St. George's Monastery, Novgorod, or Yuriev Monastery, Russia
 St. George's Monastery, Sarandë, Albania